Danube-Drava National Park was founded in 1996 and is located in the south west of Hungary. The current area is 490 square kilometres and the majority of the national park sites are located within the Danube and Drava floodland areas, of which 190 km2 are Ramsar wetlands. Black stork and White-tailed eagle populations are of European significance. Seven invertebrate species are found only here in Hungary. Habitats along the Drava host more than 400 protected plants and animals. Species endemic to national park areas include the black hawthorn and the Drava caddis fly.

External links 
 

National parks of Hungary
Protected areas established in 1996
Geography of Baranya County
Geography of Tolna County
Geography of Bács-Kiskun County
Tourist attractions in Baranya County
Tourist attractions in Tolna County
Tourist attractions in Bács-Kiskun County
1996 establishments in Hungary